Perm Oblast was a federal subject of Russia until November 30, 2005.  On December 1, 2005 it was merged with Komi-Permyak Autonomous Okrug to form Perm Krai.

Urban-type settlements under the federal government management:
Zvyozdny (Звёздный)
Cities and towns under the oblast's jurisdiction:
Perm (Пермь) (administrative center)
city districts:
Dzerzhinsky (Дзержинский)
Industrialny (Индустриальный)
Kirovsky (Кировский)
Leninsky (Ленинский)
Motovilikhinsky (Мотовилихинский)
Ordzhonikidzevsky (Орджоникидзевский)
Sverdlovsky (Свердловский)
Alexandrovsk (Александровск)
Urban-type settlements under the town's jurisdiction:
Vsevolodo-Vilva (Всеволодо-Вильва)
Yayva (Яйва)
with 5 selsovets under the town's jurisdiction.
Berezniki (Березники)
with 1 selsovet under the city's jurisdiction.
Chaykovsky (Чайковский)
with 10 selsovets under the town's jurisdiction.
Chusovoy (Чусовой)
Urban-type settlements under the town's jurisdiction:
Kalino (Калино)
Komarikhinsky (Комарихинский)
Lyamino (Лямино)
Skalny (Скальный)
Verkhnechusovskiye Gorodki (Верхнечусовские Городки)
with 6 selsovets under the town's jurisdiction.
Dobryanka (Добрянка)
Urban-type settlements under the town's jurisdiction:
Polazna (Полазна)
with 18 selsovets under the town's jurisdiction.
Gremyachinsk (Гремячинск)
Urban-type settlements under the town's jurisdiction:
Shumikhinsky (Шумихинский)
Usva (Усьва)
Yubileyny (Юбилейный)
Gubakha (Губаха)
Urban-type settlements under the town's jurisdiction:
Shirokovsky (Широковский)
Ugleuralsky (Углеуральский)
Kizel (Кизел)
Urban-type settlements under the town's jurisdiction:
Severny-Kospashsky (Северный-Коспашский)
Shakhta (Шахта)
Tsentralny-Kospashsky (Центральный-Коспашский)
Yuzhny-Kospashsky (Южный-Коспашский)
Krasnokamsk (Краснокамск)
Urban-type settlements under the town's jurisdiction:
Overyata (Оверята)
with 6 selsovets under the town's jurisdiction.
Kungur (Кунгур)
Lysva (Лысьва)
with 13 selsovets under the town's jurisdiction.
Solikamsk (Соликамск)
Districts:
Bardymsky (Бардымский)
with 17 selsovets under the district's jurisdiction.
Beryozovsky (Берёзовский)
with 12 selsovets under the district's jurisdiction.
Bolshesosnovsky (Большесосновский)
with 14 selsovets under the district's jurisdiction.
Chastinsky (Частинский)
with 11 selsovets under the district's jurisdiction.
Cherdynsky (Чердынский)
Towns under the district's jurisdiction:
Cherdyn (Чердынь)
Urban-type settlements under the district's jurisdiction:
Nyrob (Ныроб)
with 17 selsovets under the district's jurisdiction.
Chernushinsky (Чернушинский)
Towns under the district's jurisdiction:
Chernushka (Чернушка)
with 18 selsovets under the district's jurisdiction.
Gornozavodsky (Горнозаводский)
Towns under the district's jurisdiction:
Gornozavodsk (Горнозаводск)
Urban-type settlements under the district's jurisdiction:
Biser (Бисер)
Kusye-Alexandrovsky (Кусье-Александровский)
Medvedka (Медведка)
Novovilvensky (Нововильвенский)
Pashiya (Пашия)
Promysla (Промысла)
Sarany (Сараны)
Stary Biser (Старый Бисер)
Tyoplaya Gora (Тёплая Гора)
with 1 selsovet under the district's jurisdiction.
Ilyinsky (Ильинский)
Towns under the district's jurisdiction:
Chyormoz (Чёрмоз)
Urban-type settlements under the district's jurisdiction:
Ilyinsky (Ильинский)
with 16 selsovets under the district's jurisdiction.
Karagaysky (Карагайский)
with 16 selsovets under the district's jurisdiction.
Kishertsky (Кишертский)
with 14 selsovets under the district's jurisdiction.
Krasnovishersky (Красновишерский)
Towns under the district's jurisdiction:
Krasnovishersk (Красновишерск)
with 11 selsovets under the district's jurisdiction.
Kungursky (Кунгурский)
with 26 selsovets under the district's jurisdiction.
Kuyedinsky (Куединский)
with 22 selsovets under the district's jurisdiction.
Nytvensky (Нытвенский)
Towns under the district's jurisdiction:
Nytva (Нытва)
Urban-type settlements under the district's jurisdiction:
Novoilyinsky (Новоильинский)
Uralsky (Уральский)
with 11 selsovets under the district's jurisdiction.
Ochyorsky (Очёрский)
Towns under the district's jurisdiction:
Ochyor (Очёр)
Urban-type settlements under the district's jurisdiction:
Pavlovsky (Павловский)
with 10 selsovets under the district's jurisdiction.
Okhansky (Оханский)
Towns under the district's jurisdiction:
Okhansk (Оханск)
with 8 selsovets under the district's jurisdiction.
Oktyabrsky (Октябрьский)
Urban-type settlements under the district's jurisdiction:
Oktyabrsky (Октябрьский)
Sars (Сарс)
with 22 selsovets under the district's jurisdiction.
Ordinsky (Ординский)
with 14 selsovets under the district's jurisdiction.
Osinsky (Осинский)
Towns under the district's jurisdiction:
Osa (Оса)
with 13 selsovets under the district's jurisdiction.
Permsky (Пермский)
Urban-type settlements under the district's jurisdiction:
Yugo-Kamsky (Юго-Камский)
with 29 selsovets under the district's jurisdiction.
Sivinsky (Сивинский)
with 11 selsovets under the district's jurisdiction.
Solikamsky (Соликамский)
with 14 selsovets under the district's jurisdiction.
Suksunsky (Суксунский)
Urban-type settlements under the district's jurisdiction:
Suksun (Суксун)
with 14 selsovets under the district's jurisdiction.
Uinsky (Уинский)
with 13 selsovets under the district's jurisdiction.
Usolsky (Усольский)
Towns under the district's jurisdiction:
Usolye (Усолье)
Urban-type settlements under the district's jurisdiction:
Oryol (Орёл)
with 10 selsovets under the district's jurisdiction.
Vereshchaginsky (Верещагинский)
Towns under the district's jurisdiction:
Vereshchagino (Верещагино)
with 13 selsovets under the district's jurisdiction.
Yelovsky (Еловский)
with 10 selsovets under the district's jurisdiction.

References

See also
Administrative divisions of Komi-Permyak Autonomous Okrug
Administrative divisions of Perm Krai

Perm
Perm Krai